Utah State Route 125 (SR-125) is a state highway in the U.S. state of Utah. Spanning , it converts the town of Oak City in Millard County with the city of Delta and US-50 to the west, and the town of Leamington to the north.

Route description

As the route approaches Oak City, it turns to the north before passing through the town as Main Street. After leaving town, the route gradually turns to the northeast before turning north again to enter the town of Leamington, ending at its intersection with SR-132.

History
The road from Lynndyl south to Oak City was originally designated as State Route 126 in 1931, and renumbered to State Route 125 in 1933. In 1953, the route was extended from its southern terminus in Oak City, taking over the western portion of Utah State Route 135 from Oak City to Delta.

Major intersections

References

125
 125